The 2016 NBA Development League Draft was the 16th draft of the National Basketball Association Development League (NBDL). The draft was held on October 30, 2016, just before the 2016–17 season.

Key

Draft

First round

References
 D-League Draft Board

Draft
NBA G League draft
National Basketball Association lists
NBA Development League draft